Jan Töve (born May 14, 1958) is a Swedish landscape photographer, writer and lecturer.

Töve has won several awards in the Wildlife Photographer of the Year competition, owned by BBC Wildlife and The Natural History Museum, and beside his publicist's work shot a documentary for the Swedish State Television.

In 1995 he was awarded the title Årets nordiska naturfotograf (Nordic Photographer of the Year) by the Swedish photography magazine Foto. Several years later he was also awarded the Årets naturfotograf 2003 (Nature Photographer of the Year, 2003) by the Swedish Environmental Protection Agency. His first book, Speglingar (Reflections), was published in 1996 and depicts various seasonal changes in the nature.

Töve seeks to depict the border country between nature, people and society, as expressed in his latests books Riverside (2007), Silent Landscape (2012), Faraway Nearby (Hatje Cantz, 2017) and Night Light (self-published, 2020).

Bibliography

Speglingar. 1996 
Bortom redan. 2001 
Riverside Viskan. 2007 
Silent Landscape. 2012 
Faraway Nearby. 2017 
Night Light. 2020

Bibliography (photography)

Skogaryd – en skogshistoria. 1999 
Hornborgasjön. 2002 
Kunskap om skogens historia. 2003 
Fässingen: Från Borås och de sju häraderna. 2003 
Bygden runt sjön. 2004 
Vänerhavet. 2005 
De gamle och skogen – kulturarvet i skogslandskapet. 2006 
Västerut: natur mellan Vinga och Vättern. 2006 
Matsmart. 2008 
Röster från skogen. 2010 
Änglagårdsbygd. 2011 
Skogssällskapet – en växande historia 1912–2012. 2012 
Bohuskusten. 2018

External links
 Jan Töve, official web site

Swedish photographers
People from Ulricehamn Municipality
Living people
1958 births